Sema Ragalai is a 2004 Tamil-language comedy film directed by Ramkumar. The film stars Sathyaraj and Devayani, with Kalabhavan Mani in a pivotal role. The film, which had musical score by Simam Kumar, was released in 2004.

Synopsis 
Sathyaraj and Kalabhavan Mani are friends. Mani works in the Fire department and Sathyaraj aspires to go abroad. Sathyaraj, in a mix up, kidnaps Devayani. Devayani initially dislikes Sathyaraj for his persistent taunts. Later she develops a soft corner for Sathyaraj. Sathyaraj finally gets the opportunity to go abroad. Meantime, Mani loves Devayani. Climax is all about who'll get Devayani's hand.

Cast 
Sathyaraj
Devayani
Kalabhavan Mani
Chitti Babu
Bhuvaneswari
Priyanka

Soundtrack 
Music is composed by newcomer Simmamkumar

 "Agravin" – Harish Raghavendra, Harini
 "Hol Hol" – Tippu
 "Thulluvatho Ilamai" – Tippu, Simya
 "Thull Thull" – Tippu
 "Dil Irukku" – Tippu

Release 
The film opened to average reviews, with the critic noted "director Ram is inspired by the comedy tracks of Vivek and Vadivelu to a great extent but he has molded the script to suit Sathyaraj."

References 

2004 films
2000s Tamil-language films